Juno was an American indie rock band formed in Seattle in 1995. They released two studio albums, disbanding in 2003.

Career

Juno released their debut album  This Is the Way It Goes and Goes and Goes as a co-release on DeSoto Records and Pacifico Records on March 30, 1999. Their second album A Future Lived in Past Tense was released May 8, 2001 on Desoto Records. The band was critically acclaimed by various local and national music journals, and toured throughout the US, Europe and Japan. The band also released a split EP with The Dismemberment Plan on Desoto Records which included a cover of DJ Shadow's "High Noon".

The band is now officially defunct. Founding member Travis Saunders the bassist left the band in 2000. They had played with and auditioned a few different bassists (including Nate Mendel of Foo Fighters, Sunny Day Real Estate and Nick Harmer of Death Cab for Cutie), but ultimately decided that they were going in different directions artistically.

Currently some of the former members are working on Ghost Wars, a recording project led by Carstens and Eric Fisher.

Juno reunited to play two shows in Seattle on December 9 and 10  2006 for KEXP's annual Yule Benefit.

Discography

Albums 
 This Is the Way It Goes and Goes and Goes - (1999, DeSoto Records)
 A Future Lived in Past Tense - (2001, DeSoto Records)

Singles 
 "Venus on Ninth" / "Flies for Travis" - (1996, Sub Pop Records)
 "Magnified and Reduced by Inches" / "Pablo y Zelda" - (1997, Jade Tree Records)
 "All Your Friends Are Comedians" / "The Great Salt Lake" - (1998, Mag Wheel Records)
 Juno & The Dismemberment Plan - (2000, DeSoto Records)
 The Dismemberment Plan/Juno Split 7" — (2000, BCore Disc, Spain)

References

External links 
 Juno on Myspace
 Seattle Weeklyinterview
 Documentary Film of Reunion Shows including new interviews in the works

Musical groups from Washington (state)